Troy Johnson is an American gospel and soul singer. He got his first break with a track on the Blame it on Rio soundtrack in 1984, and signed to Motown Records, where he released his first album. He scored a hit in 1986 with "It's You", which peaked at number 65 on Billboard′s Hot R&B Singles chart. After a religious conversion, Johnson began recording gospel music. He put his career on hiatus in the late 1990s to focus on spiritual matters, but returned with his own label, SA Entertainment, on which he has released his most recent, secular, album, which featured a new version of "It's You" - again charting, this time peaking at number 40 on Billboard′s Adult Contemporary chart in 2005.

Discography
Getting a Grip on Love (Motown Records, 1986)
The Way It Is (RCA Records, 1989) #87 Billboard Top R&B/Hip Hop Albums
Plain and Simple (Word Records, 1993)
I Will (Word Records, 1998)
Troy Johnson (Sought After Entertainment, 2005)

References
[ Troy Johnson] at Allmusic.com

American gospel singers
American soul musicians
Living people
Year of birth missing (living people)